Clarence Hobart (June 27, 1870 –  August 2, 1930) was a tennis player from the United States. He was a six-time champion at the U.S. National Championships, winning three titles in men's doubles in 1890, 1893 and 1894 and three others in mixed doubles in 1892, 1893 and 1905. Hobart also reached the Challenge Round in the Gentlemen's Singles in 1891, finishing runner-up.

In 1905 he won the mixed doubles title at the U.S. National Championship with Augusta Schultz whom he married in 1895.

In 1899 he won the Championship of Germany, played in Homburg, by defeating A.W. Gore in the final in three straight sets and subsequently winning against Irishman Harold Mahony in the challenge round in five sets. At the same venue he reached the final of the Homburg Cup but lost in five sets to Wimbledon champion Reggie Doherty after leading 2–0 in sets.  During a 1903 tour in Europe he reached the finals of the Kent Championships and the Ostend International tournament in Belgium but was defeated by A.W. Gore and Paul de Borman respectively.

In 1907 Hobart competed in the Longwood tournament, at the time the most important tournament in the U.S. next to the national championship, and won the All-Comers tournament. This entitled him to play for the tournament title in the Challenge Round against Larned, the winner of the previous title, but he refused to play explaining "For many years I have opposed the practice of permitting the holders to stand out in our tournaments,... on the obvious ground that it is unjust to pit a tired man against a fresh one, and equally unjust to give the holder only one chance for defeat while the challenger must necessarily have several.". His refusal contributed to the abandonment in 1912 of the Challenge Round system at the U.S. National Championships.

Clarence Hobart died on August 2, 1930 as a result of an accident at a swimming pool in Asheville, NC.

Grand Slam finals

Singles (1 runner-up)

Doubles (3 titles, 5 runner-ups)

Mixed doubles (3 titles)

References

External links
Clarence Hobart on the website of The New York Times

19th-century American people
19th-century male tennis players
American male tennis players
Sportspeople from New York City
Tennis people from New York (state)
United States National champions (tennis)
1870 births
1930 deaths
Grand Slam (tennis) champions in mixed doubles
Grand Slam (tennis) champions in men's doubles